Sweet-Escott is the surname of:
 Ernest Bickham Sweet-Escott (1857–1941) British colonial administrator 
 Ralph Sweet-Escott (1869–1907) English rugby union player
 Edward Sweet-Escott (1879—1956) English cricketer, brother of Ralph

See also
 Sweet (surname)
 Escott (disambiguation)

Compound surnames
English-language surnames